James Leonard Gaynor (born 1944) is an Irish former hurler who played as a left wing-back at senior level for the Tipperary county team.

Early life
Born and raised in Kilruane, County Tipperary, Barry first played as a schoolboy in various juvenile competitions at Kilruane National School before later lining out as a student at St Flannan's College in Ennis. He lined out in the Harty Cup but success eluded him in that competition. Gaynor captained St Flannan's to the Dean Ryan Cup title in 1961 after a 6-07 to 1-03 defeat of De La Salle College Waterford in the final.

Club career
Gaynor played his first juvenile game for the Kilruane MacDonaghs club as an 11-year-old in 1955. He enjoyed his first major success in 1959 when he captained Kilruane to the Tipperary U15HC title after a defeat of a Babs Keating-inspired Ballybacon-Grange in the final. Gaynor made his first appearance for the Kilruane MacDonaghs senior team in a tournament game against Thurles Sarsfields on Easter Sunday 1962. 

Gaynor claimed his first senior silverware in 1965 when Kilruane beat Lorrha to win the North Tipperary SHC, however, success at county level had eluded the club. By 1977 he had contemplated retirement from the club's senior team, however, he remained on as player-coach. It was a successful decision as Kilruane won three successive Tipperary SHC titles from 1977 to 1979 after defeats of Borris-Ileigh, Roscrea and Thurles Sarsfields.

After stepping away from the Kilruane MacDonaghs senior team, Gaynor continued to line out with the club's junior team. He won a Tipperary JAHC title in 1985 after a 17-point defeat of Cappawhite in the final. Gaynor brought his 34-year playing career to an end when he lined out in goal in a North Tipperary JBHC game against Moneygall in 1989.

Inter-county
Performances at colleges and club level earned Gaynor a call-up to the Tipperary minor hurling team in 1962. He won a Munster MHC title that year after lining out at centre-forward in the 10-point defeat of Cork, however, Tipperary were beaten by Kilkenny in the 1962 All-Ireland minor final. After a year out of inter-county activity, Gaynor was selected for the inaugural Tipperary under-21 hurling team in 1964. Tipperary dominated that year's championship, winning all of their matches by an average of 23 points. Gaynor added a Munstr U21HC to his provincial collection after a defeat of Cork before lining out at left wing-back in the 1964 All-Ireland under-21 final defeat of Wexford. He claimed a second successive provincial winners' medal the following year, however, Wexford reversed the previous year's result by beating Tipperary by 3-07 to 1-04 in the 1964 All-Ireland under-21 final.

By that stage Gaynor had already joined the senior team. He was an unused substitute throughout the 1964 campaign and, after collecting a Munster SHC medal, ended the season by being listed as one of the substitutes for the 1964 All-Ireland final defeat of Kilkenny. Gaynor later made his debut in the Oireachtas Tournament.

Gaynor was a regular member of the starting fifteen throughout the 1964-65 league and championship campaigns. He won a second successive Munster SHC medal - his first on the field of play - after an 18-point win over Cork in the Munster final. Gaynor collected a second successive All-Ireland winners' medal following the 2-16 to 0-10 defeat of Wexford in the 1965 All-Ireland final. He ended the season by claiming a first National League title after a defeat of New York.

After an unsuccessful season in 1966, Gaynor won a third Munster winners' medal after a defeat of Clare in the 1967 Munster final. He was named in his customary left wing-back position for the 3-08 to 2-07 defeat by Kilkenny in the 1967 All-Ireland final. In spite of this defeat, Gaynor was named Tipperary Hurler of the Year and was also selected on the Gaelic Weekly Team of the Year.

Gaynor won a second National League title after a defeat of New York at the end of the 1967-68 league season. He later won a fourth Munster title in five years after a 2-13 to 1-07 win over Cork in the 1968 Munster final. The 1968 All-Ireland final was the fourth Tipperary-Wexford final of the decade and, in spite of his side holding an eight-point half-time lead, Gaynor ended up on the losing side for the second successive year.

After two seasons without success, Gaynor won his fifth and final provincial winners' medal in 1971 after a one-point defeat of Limerick in the final. The subsequent All-Ireland final saw Tipperary win with a goal to spare over Kilkenny, with Gaynor quoted in the Irish Press as saying:  "It was the best match in which I have played and I am tremendously proud to win my third All-Ireland medal."

Managerial career

In the early 1990s Gaynor served as manager of the Clare senior hurling team. He had some success by steering the county to two consecutive Munster final appearances in 1993 and 1994, however, these games ended in huge defeats for Clare. He was replaced in 1995 by Ger Loughnane. In 1997 Gaynor became manager of the Tipperary senior hurling team. Once again his tenure in charge was mixed, as Tipp were defeated in both the Munster and All-Ireland finals in the first year of the "back-door" system.

Honours

Player
St Flannan's College
Dean Ryan Cup: 1961 (c)

Kilruane MacDonaghs
Tipperary Senior Hurling Championship: 1977, 1978, 1979
North Tipperary Senior Hurling Championship: 1965, 1977, 1978, 1979
Tipperary Junior A Hurling Championship: 1985
North Tipperary Junior A Hurling Championship: 1985

Tipperary
All-Ireland Senior Hurling Championship: 1964, 1965, 1971
Munster Senior Hurling Championship: 1964, 1965, 1967, 1968, 1971
National Hurling League: 1964–65, 1967–68
All-Ireland Under-21 Hurling Championship: 1964
Munster Under-21 Hurling Championship: 1964, 1965
Munster Minor Hurling Championship: 1962

Munster
Railway Cup: 1968, 1969, 1970

Management
Kilruane MacDonaghs
All-Ireland Senior Club Hurling Championship: 1986
Munster Senior Club Hurling Championship: 1985
Tipperary Senior Hurling Championship: 1977, 1978, 1979, 1985
North Tipperary Senior Hurling Championship: 1977, 1978, 1979, 1985, 1986, 1987
Tipperary Under-21 A Hurling Championship: 1973, 1974, 1975, 1976
North Tipperary Under-21 A Hurling Championship: 1972, 1973, 1974, 1975, 1976, 1978
Tipperary Minor A Hurling Championship: 1972
North Tipperary Minor A Hurling Championship: 1971, 1972

Moycarkey-Borris
Tipperary Senior Hurling Championship: 1982
Mid Tipperary Senior Hurling Championship: 1982

Shannon Rovers
Tipperary Intermediate Hurling Championship: 1986
North Tipperary Intermediate Hurling Championship: 1985, 1986

Newport
Tipperary Intermediate Hurling Championship: 1989
North Tipperary Intermediate Hurling Championship: 1989

Clonoulty-Rossmore
Tipperary Senior Hurling Championship: 1989
West Tipperary Senior Hurling Championship: 1989

Tipperary
Ford Cup: 1985
Munster Under-21 Hurling Championship: 2006

References

1944 births
Living people
Tipperary inter-county hurlers
Kilruane MacDonaghs hurlers
Munster inter-provincial hurlers
Hurling managers
Irish farmers
All-Ireland Senior Hurling Championship winners
People from Cloughjordan